Horisme corticata is a moth of the family Geometridae. The species can be found from Denmark up to Poland, Austria, Hungary and Romania and from central Italy, the Balkan and Anatolia up to the Caucasus and Southern Russia.

The wingspan is 26–28 mm. The moths fly from April to September depending on the location.

The larvae feed on Clematis vitalba, Clematis viticella and Anemone sylvestris.

External links
 www.lepiforum.de
 Moths and Butterflies of Europe and North Africa

Melanthiini
Moths of Europe
Moths of Asia
Moths described in 1835